Horst Knörrer (born 31 July 1953, in Bayreuth) is a German mathematician, who studies algebraic geometry and mathematical physics.

Knörrer studied from 1971 at University of Regensburg and University of Erlangen-Nuremberg and received a doctorate in 1978 from the
University of Bonn under the supervision of Egbert Brieskorn (Isolierte Singularitäten von Durchschnitten zweier Quadriken). After that, he was a research assistant until 1985 in Bonn, interrupted by two years 1980 to 1982 at the
Leiden University. In 1985 he completed his habilitation in Bonn and was a Heisenberg fellow the following two years. During 1986/87, he was a department representative at the University of Düsseldorf. Since 1987, he is a full professor of mathematics at the ETH Zurich.

Knörrer studies algebraic geometry and its connection to mathematical physics, for example, for integrable systems, as well as mathematical theory of many-particle systems in statistical mechanics and solid state physics (Fermi liquids). Together with Brieskorn, he wrote an extensive and rich
illustrated textbook on algebraic curves, which also was translated into English.

Writings

References 
The original article was a translation of the corresponding German article.

External links 
 Homepage an der ETH

20th-century German mathematicians
21st-century German mathematicians
1953 births
Living people
Algebraic geometers
Academic staff of ETH Zurich